FK Golemo Konjari is a football club based in village of Golemo Konjari near Prilep, North Macedonia. They are currently competing in the Macedonian Third League (South Division).

History
The club was in history played in the Macedonian Second League as Bratstvo.

References

External links
Club info at MacedonianFootball 
Football Federation of Macedonia 

Golemo Konjari
Prilep Municipality